A fusion energy gain factor, usually expressed with the symbol Q, is the ratio of fusion power produced in a nuclear fusion reactor to the power required to maintain the plasma in steady state. The condition of Q = 1, when the power being released by the fusion reactions is equal to the required heating power, is referred to as breakeven, or in some sources, scientific breakeven.

The energy given off by the fusion reactions may be captured within the fuel, leading to self-heating. Most fusion reactions release at least some of their energy in a form that cannot be captured within the plasma, so a system at Q = 1 will cool without external heating. With typical fuels, self-heating in fusion reactors is not expected to match the external sources until at least Q ≈ 5. If Q increases past this point, increasing self-heating eventually removes the need for external heating. At this point the reaction becomes self-sustaining, a condition called combustion, and is generally regarded as highly desirable for practical reactor designs. Ignition corresponds to infinite Q, in which case no energy input is required to start self sustaining fusion reactions in the plasma.

Over time, several related terms have entered the fusion lexicon. Energy that is not captured within the fuel can be captured externally to produce electricity. That electricity can be used to heat the plasma to operational temperatures. A system that is self-powered in this way is referred to as running at engineering breakeven. Operating above engineering breakeven, a machine would produce more electricity than it uses and could sell that excess. One that sells enough electricity to cover its operating costs is sometimes known as economic breakeven. Additionally, fusion fuels, especially tritium, are very expensive, so many experiments run on various test gasses like hydrogen or deuterium. A reactor running on these fuels that reaches the conditions for breakeven, if tritium was introduced, would be operating at breakeven, and this theoretical threshold is referred to as extrapolated breakeven.

In 2021, the record for Q was held by the National Ignition Facility in the US, at Q = (1.35 MW)/(1.9 MW) ≈ 0.70, first attained in August 2021. The highest record for extrapolated breakeven was posted by the JT-60 device, with Qext = 1.25, slightly besting JET's earlier 1.14. ITER was originally designed to reach ignition, but is currently designed to reach Q = 10, producing 500 MW of fusion power from 50 MW of injected thermal power.

On December 13, 2022, the United States Department of Energy announced that a gain factor greater than 1 was achieved by the National Ignition Facility at Lawrence Livermore National Laboratory in California using inertial confinement fusion, delivering 2.05 MJ to generate 3.15 MJ from the resulting fusion reaction. This is roughly equivalent to a gain factor Q = 1.54 and is the first time that a gain factor Q ≥ 1 has been achieved in the history of nuclear fusion, besides in thermonuclear weapons.

Concept
Q is simply the comparison of the power being released by the fusion reactions in a reactor, Pfus, to the constant heating power being supplied, Pheat, in normal operating conditions. For those designs that do not run in the steady state, but are instead pulsed, the same calculation can be made by summing all of the fusion energy produced in Pfus and all of the energy expended producing the pulse in Pheat. However, there are several definitions of breakeven that consider additional power losses.

Breakeven
In 1955, John Lawson was the first to explore the energy balance mechanisms in detail, initially in classified works but published openly in a now-famous 1957 paper. In this paper he considered and refined work by earlier researchers, notably Hans Thirring, Peter Thonemann, and a review article by Richard Post. Expanding on all of these, Lawson's paper made detailed predictions for the amount of power that would be lost through various mechanisms, and compared that to the energy needed to sustain the reaction. This balance is today known as the Lawson criterion.

In a successful fusion reactor design, the fusion reactions generate an amount of power designated Pfus. Some amount of this energy, Ploss, is lost through a variety of mechanisms, mostly convection of the fuel to the walls of the reactor chamber and various forms of radiation that cannot be captured to generate power. In order to keep the reaction going, the system has to provide heating to make up for these losses, where Ploss = Pheat to maintain thermal equilibrium.

The most basic definition of breakeven is when Q = 1, that is, Pfus = Pheat.

Some works refer to this definition as scientific breakeven, to contrast it with similar terms. However, this usage is rare outside certain areas, specifically the inertial confinement fusion field, where the term is much more widely used. Inertial devices, and many similar concepts, do not attempt to maintain equilibrium but simply capture the energy produced. In this case, Pheat considers all of the energy needed to produce the reaction, whether it be direct heating or other systems such as laser or magnetic compression.

Extrapolated breakeven
Since the 1950s, most commercial fusion reactor designs have been based on a mix of deuterium and tritium as their primary fuel; other fuels have attractive features but are much harder to ignite. As tritium is radioactive, highly bioactive, and highly mobile, it represents a significant safety concern and adds to the cost of designing and operating such a reactor.

In order to lower costs, many experimental machines are designed to run on test fuels of hydrogen or deuterium alone, leaving out the tritium. In this case, the term extrapolated breakeven is used to define the expected performance of the machine running on D-T fuel based on the performance when running on hydrogen or deuterium alone.

The records for extrapolated breakeven are slightly higher than the records for scientific breakeven. Both JET and JT-60 have reached values around 1.25 (see below for details) while running on D-D fuel. When running on D-T, only possible in JET, the maximum performance is about half the extrapolated value.

Engineering breakeven
Another related term, engineering breakeven, considers the need to extract the energy from the reactor, turn that into electrical energy, and feed some of that back into the heating system. This closed loop sending electricity from the fusion back into the heating system is known as recirculation. In this case, the basic definition changes by adding additional terms to the Pfus side to consider the efficiencies of these processes.

D-T reactions release most of their energy as neutrons and a smaller amount as charged particles like alpha particles. Neutrons are electrically neutral and will travel out of any magnetic confinement fusion (MFE) design, and in spite of the very high densities found in inertial confinement fusion (ICF) designs, they tend to easily escape the fuel mass in these designs as well. This means that only the charged particles from the reactions can be captured within the fuel mass and give rise to self-heating. If the fraction of the energy being released in the charged particles is fch, then the power in these particles is Pch = fchPfus. If this self-heating process is perfect, that is, all of Pch is captured in the fuel, that means the power available for generating electricity is the power that is not released in that form, or (1 − fch)Pfus.

In the case of neutrons carrying most of the practical energy, as is the case in the D-T fuel, this neutron energy is normally captured in a "blanket" of lithium that produces more tritium that is used to fuel the reactor. Due to various exothermic and endothermic reactions, the blanket may have a power gain factor MR. MR is typically on the order of 1.1 to 1.3, meaning it produces a small amount of energy as well. The net result, the total amount of energy released to the environment and thus available for energy production, is referred to as PR, the net power output of the reactor.

The blanket is then cooled and the cooling fluid used in a heat exchanger driving conventional steam turbines and generators. That electricity is then fed back into the heating system. Each of these steps in the generation chain has an efficiency to consider. In the case of the plasma heating systems,  is on the order of 60 to 70%, while modern generator systems based on the Rankine cycle have  around 35 to 40%. Combining these we get a net efficiency of the power conversion loop as a whole, of around 0.20 to 0.25. That is, about 20 to 25% of  can be recirculated.

Thus, the fusion energy gain factor required to reach engineering breakeven is defined as:

To understand how  is used, consider a reactor operating at 20 MW and Q = 2. Q = 2 at 20 MW implies that Pheat is 10 MW. Of that original 20 MW about 20% is alphas, so assuming complete capture, 4 MW of Pheat is self-supplied. We need a total of 10 MW of heating and get 4 of that through alphas, so we need another 6 MW of power. Of the original 20 MW of output, 4 MW are left in the fuel, so we have 16 MW of net output. Using MR of 1.15 for the blanket, we get PR about 18.4 MW. Assuming a good  of 0.25, that requires 24 MW PR, so a reactor at Q = 2 cannot reach engineering breakeven. At Q = 4 one needs 5 MW of heating, 4 of which come from the fusion, leaving 1 MW of external power required, which can easily be generated by the 18.4 MW net output. Thus for this theoretical design the QE is between 2 and 4.

Ignition

As the temperature of the plasma increases, the rate of fusion reactions grows rapidly, and with it, the rate of self-heating. In contrast, non-capturable energy losses like x-rays do not grow at the same rate. Thus, in overall terms, the self-heating process becomes more efficient as the temperature increases, and less energy is needed from external sources to keep it hot.

Eventually Pheat reaches zero, that is, all of the energy needed to keep the plasma at the operational temperature is being supplied by self-heating, and the amount of external energy that needs to be added drops to zero. This point is known as ignition. In the case of D-T fuel, where only 20% of the energy is released as alphas that give rise to self-heating, this cannot occur until the plasma is releasing at least five times the power needed to keep it at its working temperature.

Ignition, by definition, corresponds to an infinite Q, but it does not mean that frecirc drops to zero as the other power sinks in the system, like the magnets and cooling systems, still need to be powered. Generally, however, these are much smaller than the energy in the heaters, and require a much smaller frecirc. More importantly, this number is more likely to be near-constant, meaning that further improvements in plasma performance will result in more energy that can be directly used for commercial generation, as opposed to recirculation.

Commercial breakeven
The final definition of breakeven is commercial breakeven, which occurs when the economic value of any net electricity left over after recirculation is enough to pay for the reactor. This value depends both on the reactor's capital cost and any financing costs related to that, its operating costs including fuel and maintenance, and the spot price of electrical power.

Commercial breakeven relies on factors outside the technology of the reactor itself, and it is possible that even a reactor with a fully ignited plasma operating well beyond engineering breakeven will not generate enough electricity rapidly enough to pay for itself. Whether any of the mainline concepts like ITER can reach this goal is being debated in the field.

Practical example
Most fusion reactor designs being studied  are based on the D-T reaction, as this is by far the easiest to ignite, and is energy-dense. However, this reaction also gives off most of its energy in the form of a single highly energetic neutron, and only 20% of the energy in the form of an alpha. Thus, for the D-T reaction, fch = 0.2. This means that self-heating does not become equal to the external heating until at least Q = 5. 

Efficiency values depend on design details but may be in the range of ηheat = 0.7 (70%) and ηelec = 0.4 (40%). The purpose of a fusion reactor is to produce power, not to recirculate it, so a practical reactor must have frecirc = 0.2 approximately. Lower would be better but will be hard to achieve. Using these values we find for a practical reactor Q = 22.

Considering ITER, we have a design that produces 500 MW of energy for 50 MW of supply. If 20% of the output is self-heating, that means 400 MW escape. Assuming the same ηheat = 0.7 and ηelec = 0.4, ITER (in theory) could produce as much as 112 MW of heating. This means ITER would operate at engineering breakeven. However, ITER is not equipped with power-extraction systems, so this remains theoretical until follow-on machines like DEMO.

Transient vs. continual
Many early fusion devices operated for microseconds, using some sort of pulsed power source to feed their magnetic confinement system while using the compression from the confinement as the heating source. Lawson defined breakeven in this context as the total energy released by the entire reaction cycle compared to the total energy supplied to the machine during the same cycle.

Over time, as performance increased by orders of magnitude, the reaction times have extended from microseconds to seconds, and in ITER, on the order of minutes. In this case definition of "the entire reaction cycle" becomes blurred. In the case of an ignited plasma, for instance, Pheat may be quite high while the system is being set up, and then drop to zero when it is fully developed, so one may be tempted to pick an instant in time when it is operating at its best to determine a high, or infinite, Q. A better solution in these cases is to use the original Lawson definition averaged over the reaction to produce a similar value as the original definition.

There is an additional complication. During the heating phase when the system is being brought up to operational conditions, some of the energy released by the fusion reactions will be used to heat the surrounding fuel, and thus not be released to the environment. This is no longer true when the plasma reaches its operational temperature and enters thermal equilibrium. Thus, if one averages over the entire cycle, this energy will be included as part of the heating term, that is, some of the energy that was captured for heating would otherwise have been released in Pfus and is therefore not indicative of an operational Q.

Operators of the JET reactor argued that this input should be removed from the total:

where:

That is, Ptemp is the power applied to raise the internal energy of the plasma. It is this definition that was used when reporting JET's record 0.67 value.

Some debate over this definition continues. In 1998, the operators of the JT-60 claimed to have reached Q = 1.25 running on D-D fuel, thus reaching extrapolated breakeven. This measurement was based on the JET definition of Q*. Using this definition, JET had also reached extrapolated breakeven some time earlier. If one considers the energy balance in these conditions, and the analysis of previous machines, it is argued the original definition should be used, and thus both machines remain well below break-even of any sort.

Scientific breakeven at NIF
Although most fusion experiments use some form of magnetic confinement, another major branch is inertial confinement fusion (ICF) that mechanically presses together the fuel mass (the "target") to increase its density. This greatly increases the rate of fusion events and lowers the need to confine the fuel for long periods. This compression is accomplished by heating a lightweight capsule holding the fuel using some form of "driver". There are a variety of proposed drivers, but to date, most experiments have used lasers. 

Using the traditional definition of Q, Pfus / Pheat, ICF devices have extremely low Q. This is because the laser is extremely inefficient; whereas  for the heaters used in magnetic systems might be on the order of 70%, lasers are on the order of 1%.

For this reason, Lawrence Livermore National Laboratory (LLNL), the leader in ICF research, has proposed another modification of Q that defines Pheat as the energy delivered by the driver to the capsule, as opposed to the energy put into the driver by an external power source. That is, they propose removing the laser's inefficiency from the consideration of gain. This definition produces much higher Q values, and changes the definition of breakeven to be Pfus / Plaser = 1. On occasion, they referred to this definition as "scientific breakeven". This term was not universally used; other groups adopted the redefinition of Q but continued to refer to Pfus = Plaser simply as breakeven. 

On 7 October 2013, LLNL announced that it had achieved scientific breakeven in the National Ignition Facility (NIF) on 29 September. In this experiment, Pfus was approximately 14 kJ, while the laser output was 1.8 MJ. By their previous definition, this would be a Q of 0.0077. For this press release, they re-defined Q once again, this time equating Pheat to be only the amount energy delivered to "the hottest portion of the fuel", calculating that only 10 kJ of the original laser energy reached the part of the fuel that was undergoing fusion reactions. This release has been heavily criticized in the field.

On 17 August 2021, the NIF announced that in early August 2021, an experiment had achieved a Q value of 0.7, producing 1.35 MJ of energy from a fuel capsule by focusing 1.9 MJ of laser energy on the capsule. The result was an eight-fold increase over any prior energy output.

On December 13, 2022, the United States Department of Energy announced that NIF had exceeded the previously elusive Q ≥ 1 milestone on December 5, 2022. This was achieved by producing 3.15 MJ after delivering 2.05 MJ to the target, for an equivalent Q of 1.54.

Notes

References

Citations

Bibliography
 
 

Fusion power
Energy
Energy economics